Compression Attached Memory Module (CAMM) is a memory module developed at Dell by engineer Tom Schnell as a replacement for SO-DIMM which has been around for 25 years.

It was first used in the Dell Precision 7000-series laptops in 2022. The module is interfaced with the motherboard using a land grid array type design.

JEDEC refers to the form factor as CAMM Common Spec, in which CAMM 1.0 specification set to be finalized in the second half of 2023 and could be featured on laptops by 2024.

According to Tom Schnell, SO-DIMM run into problems at 6400 MHz.

Advantages are that it is thinner, allows for replaceable LPDDR modules, provide faster speeds above 6400 MHz, more capacities up to 128 GB per module and higher bandwidth. Disadvantages are that it cannot be mounted without tools and uses six screws.

History 
In April 2022, Dell launched laptops in the Dell Precision 7000-series that used a custom form factor of CAMM for DDR5 SDRAM.

References 

Computer memory form factor
Computer-related introductions in 2022
Dell